The Cullen Report can refer to one of three reports of public inquiries into UK disasters that were overseen by William Cullen, Baron Cullen of Whitekirk.

Piper Alpha
The first Cullen Report was prompted by Occidental Petroleum's Piper Alpha disaster on 6 July 1988, in which gas condensate ignited, killing 167 of the 229 people on board the oil platform in only 22 minutes.

Dunblane Massacre
In 1996, Lord Cullen led the inquiry into the massacre at Dunblane Primary School.

Ladbroke Grove
The third Cullen Report was a result of Lord Cullen's appointment to chair the 1999 Ladbroke Grove Rail Inquiry.

References

Public inquiries in the United Kingdom
Public safety
British Royal Commissions
Reports of the Scottish Government
1988 establishments in the United Kingdom
Public inquiries in Scotland
Dunblane massacre